The NW (North Western) postcode area, also known as the London NW postcode area, is a group of 13 postcode districts covering around 13,895 live postcodes within part of northwest London, England. It is the successor of the NW sector,  originally created as part of the London postal district in 1856.

Postal administration
London postal arrangements were refined in 1917 when all its postcode districts (seven radial which are large and two innermost, much smaller) became publicly sub-divided; these were named after the location of the delivery office in each district. As London is one post town, district names are deprecated, in favour of the post town LONDON to be written/typed.

Within each NW postcode district, PO boxes are allocated to a unique postcode sector, except for two districts which use all available sectors for ordinary addresses and therefore have their separate non-geographic districts: NW1W for PO boxes in NW1 and NW26 for PO boxes in NW10.

List of postcode districts
The approximate coverage of the postcode districts, with the historic postal district names shown in italics:

 
|-
! NW1
| LONDON
| North Western head district: Marylebone (part), Euston, Regent's Park, Baker Street, Camden Town,  Somers Town, Primrose Hill (part) and Lisson Grove (part)
| Camden, Westminster
|-
! style="background:#FFFFFF;"|NW1W
| style="background:#FFFFFF;"|LONDON
| style="background:#FFFFFF;"|PO boxes in NW1
| style="background:#FFFFFF;"|non-geographic
|-
! NW2
| LONDON
| Cricklewood district: Cricklewood, Dollis Hill, Childs Hill, Golders Green (part), Brent Cross (part), Willesden (north), Neasden (north)
| Barnet, Brent, Camden
|-
! NW3
| LONDON
| Hampstead district: Hampstead, Belsize Park, Frognal, Childs Hill (east), South Hampstead (north), Swiss Cottage (east), Primrose Hill (north), Chalk Farm (west), Gospel Oak
| Camden, Barnet
|-
! NW4
| LONDON
| Hendon district: Hendon, Brent Cross (part)
| Barnet
|-
! NW5
| LONDON
| Kentish Town district: Kentish Town, Camden Town (part), Gospel Oak (part), Dartmouth Park, Chalk Farm (east), Tufnell Park (west)
| Camden, Islington
|-
! NW6
| LONDON
| Kilburn district: Kilburn, Brondesbury, West Hampstead, Queen's Park, Kensal Green (part), South Hampstead (south), Swiss Cottage (west)
| Brent, Camden, Westminster
|-
! NW7
| LONDON
| Mill Hill district: Mill Hill, Arkley (part), Edgware (part)
| Barnet
|-
! NW8
| LONDON
| St John's Wood district: St John's Wood, Primrose Hill (south), Marylebone (north), Lisson Grove (north)
| Westminster, Camden
|-
! NW9
| LONDON
| The Hyde district: The Hyde, Colindale, Kingsbury, West Hendon, Wembley Park (part), Queensbury (part)
| Barnet, Brent, Harrow
|-
! NW10
| LONDON
| Willesden district: Willesden, Harlesden, Kensal Green, Brent Park, College Park, Stonebridge, North Acton (part), West Twyford, Neasden (south), Old Oak Common, Park Royal (north)
| Brent, Ealing, Hammersmith and Fulham, Kensington and Chelsea
|-
! NW11
| LONDON
| Golders Green district: Golders Green, Temple Fortune, Hampstead Garden Suburb (west), Hendon (part), Brent Cross (part)
| Barnet
|-
! style="background:#FFFFFF;"|NW26
| style="background:#FFFFFF;"|LONDON
| style="background:#FFFFFF;"|PO boxes in NW10
| style="background:#FFFFFF;"|non-geographic 
|}

Boundaries
Postcode district NW1 is central to London, with the NW2–11 postcode districts radiating outwards to the northwest. The boundaries of the area and its numbered districts have changed over time and are the result of the working requirements of Royal Mail. They are not tied to those of the local authority areas served; consequently a locality name might describe varying areas. The postcode area contains large parts of London Boroughs of Barnet, Brent and Camden with small parts of  the City of Westminster and those of Ealing, Hammersmith and Fulham, Harrow, Islington and Kensington & Chelsea. The NW7 district is a projection as far as Hertfordshire's near edge, which it mirrors or emulates briefly near Scratch Wood.

In popular culture
In 2008, the ska band Madness released a single called "NW5", named after the postal district of the same name.

In 2012, the British author Zadie Smith released a book called NW, named after the postal district of the same name, where the novel is set. The novel was adapted into a 2016 television film by the BBC.

Map

The remainder of northwest Greater London is covered by the HA, UB, part of the EN and a small section of WD.

See also
List of postcode areas in the United Kingdom
London postal district
Postcode Address File

References

External links
Royal Mail's Postcode Address File
A quick introduction to Royal Mail's Postcode Address File (PAF)

Postcode areas covering London
Media and communications in the London Borough of Brent
Media and communications in the London Borough of Barnet
Media and communications in the London Borough of Camden
Media and communications in the City of Westminster